A  is a form of Classical Chinese used in Japan from the Nara period to the mid-20th century. Much of Japanese literature was written in this style and it was the general writing style for official and intellectual works throughout the period. As a result, Sino-Japanese vocabulary makes up a large portion of the Japanese lexicon and much classical Chinese literature is accessible to Japanese readers in some semblance of the original. The corresponding system in Korean is gugyeol.

History
The Japanese writing system originated through adoption and adaptation of Written Chinese. Some of Japan's oldest books (e.g., Nihon Shoki) and dictionaries (e.g., Tenrei Banshō Meigi and Wamyō Ruijushō) were written in kanbun. Other Japanese literary genres have parallels; the Kaifūsō is the oldest collection of  "Chinese poetry composed by Japanese poets". Burton Watson's English translations of kanbun compositions provide an introduction to this literary field.

Samuel Martin coined the term "Sino-Xenic" in 1953 to describe Chinese as written in Japan, Korea, and other "foreign" (hence "-xenic") zones on China's periphery. Roy Andrew Miller notes that although Japanese kanbun conventions have Sino-Xenic parallels with other traditions for reading Classical Chinese like Korean hanmun  and Vietnamese Hán Văn, only kanbun has survived into the present day. He explains how
in the Japanese kanbun reading tradition a Chinese text is simultaneously punctuated, analyzed, and translated into classical Japanese. It operates according to a limited canon of Japanese forms and syntactic structures which are treated as existing in a one-to-one alignment with the vocabulary and structures of classical Chinese. At its worst, this system for reading Chinese as if it were Japanese became a kind of lazy schoolboy's trot to a classical text; at its best, it has preserved the analysis and interpretation of large body of literary Chinese texts which would otherwise have been completely lost; hence, the kanbun tradition can often be of great value for an understanding of early Chinese literature.

William C. Hannas points out the linguistic hurdles involved in kanbun transformation.
Kanbun, literally "Chinese writing," refers to a genre of techniques for making Chinese texts read like Japanese, or for writing in a way imitative of Chinese. For a Japanese, neither of these tasks could be accomplished easily because of the two languages' different structures. As I have mentioned, Chinese is an isolating language. Its grammatical relations are identified in subject–verb–object (SVO) order and through the use of particles similar to English prepositions. Inflection plays no role in the grammar. Morphemes are typically one syllable in length and combine to form words without modification to their phonetic structures (tone excepted). Conversely, the basic structure of a transitive Japanese sentence is SOV, with the usual syntactic features associated with languages of this typology, including post positions, that is, grammar particles that appear after the words and phrases to which they apply.
He lists four major Japanese problems: word order, parsing which Chinese characters should be read together, deciding how to pronounce the characters, and finding suitable equivalents for Chinese function words.

According to John Timothy Wixted, scholars have disregarded kanbun.
In terms of its size, often its quality, and certainly its importance both at the time it was written and cumulatively in the cultural tradition, kanbun is arguably the biggest and most important area of Japanese literary study that has been ignored in recent times, and the one least properly represented as part of the canon.
A new development in kanbun studies is the Web-accessible database being developed by scholars at Nishōgakusha University in Tokyo.

Conventions and terminology
The Japanese word  originally meant "Classical Chinese writings, Chinese classic texts, Classical Chinese literature".

Compositions written in kanbun used two common types of Japanese  readings: Sino-Japanese on'yomi ( "pronunciation readings") borrowed from Chinese pronunciations and native Japanese  from Japanese equivalents. For example,  can be read as dō adapted from Middle Chinese /dấw/ or as michi from the indigenous Japanese word meaning "road, street".

It is important to note these were used primarily as reinforcements to the Kanbun writing.

Kanbun – as opposed to  meaning "Japanese text, composition written with Japanese syntax and predominately kun'yomi readings" – is subdivided into several types.
 "Chinese text, composition written with Chinese syntax and on'yomi Chinese characters"
 "unpunctuated kanbun text without reading aids"
 "Sino-Japanese composition written with Japanese syntax and mixed on'yomi and kun'yomi readings"
 "Chinese modified with Japanese syntax; a Japanized version of classical Chinese"
Jean-Noël Robert describes kanbun as a "perfectly frozen, 'dead,' language" that was continuously used from the late Heian Period until after World War II.
Classical Chinese, which, as we have seen, had long since ceased to be a spoken language on the mainland (if indeed it had ever been), has been in use in the Japanese archipelago longer than the Japanese language itself. The oldest written remnants found in Japan are all in Chinese, though it is a matter of considerable debate whether traces of the Japanese vernacular are to be found in them. Taking both languages together until the end of the nineteenth century, and taking into account all the monastic documents, literature in the widest sense of the term, and texts in "near-Chinese" (hentai-kanbun), it is entirely possible that the sheer volume of texts written in Chinese in Japan slightly exceed what was written in Japanese.

Inasmuch as Classical Chinese was originally unpunctuated, the kanbun tradition developed various conventional reading punctuation, diacritical, and syntactic markers.
 "guiding marks for rendering Chinese into Japanese"
 "the Japanese reading/pronunciation of a kanji character"
 "a Japanese reading of a Chinese passage"
 "diacritical dots on characters to indicate Japanese grammatical inflections"
 "punctuation marks (e.g., 、comma and 。 period)"
 "marks placed alongside characters indicating their Japanese ordering is to be 'returned' (read in reverse)"
Kaeriten grammatically transform Classical Chinese into Japanese word order. Two are syntactic symbols, the |  "linking mark" denotes phrases composed of more than one characters, and the   denotes "return/reverse marks". The rest are kanji commonly used in numbering and ordering systems: 4 numerals ichi  "one", ni  "two", san  "three", and yon  "four"; 3 locatives ue  "top", naka 中 "middle", and shita  "bottom"; 4 Heavenly Stems kinoe  "first", kinoto  "second", hinoe  "third", and hinoto  "fourth"; and the 3 cosmological  ten  "heaven", chi  "earth", and jin  "person". For written English, these kaeriten would correspond with 1, 2, 3; I, II, III; A, B, C, etc.

As an analogy for kanbun "mentally changing the word order" from Chinese sentences with subject–verb–object (SVO) into Japanese subject–object–verb (SOV), John DeFrancis gives this example of using an English (another SVO language) literal translation to render the Latin (another SOV) Commentarii de Bello Gallico opening.

DeFrancis adds, "A better analogy would be the reverse situation–Caesar rendering an English text in his native language and adding Latin case endings."

Two English textbooks for students of kanbun are An Introduction to Kambun by Sydney Crawcour, reviewed by Marian Ury in 1990, and An Introduction to Japanese Kanbun by Komai and Rohlich, reviewed by Andrew Markus in 1990 and Wixted in 1998.

Example

The illustration to the right exemplifies kanbun. These eight words comprise the well-known first line in the Han Feizi story (chap. 36, 難一 "Collection of Difficulties, No. 1") that first coined the term máodùn (Japanese mujun,  'contradiction, inconsistency', lit. "spear-shield"), illustrating the irresistible force paradox. Debating with a Confucianist about the legendary Chinese sage rulers Yao and Shun, legalist Han Fei argues that you cannot praise them both because you would be making a "spear-shield" contradiction.

Among the Chu, there was a man selling shields and spears. He praised the former saying, "My shields are so solid nothing can penetrate them". Then he would praise his spears saying, "My spears are so sharp that among all things there's nothing they can't penetrate". Somebody else said, "If somebody tried to penetrate your shields with your spears, what would happen?" The man could not respond.

The first sentence would read thus, using present-day Mandarin pronunciation:

A fairly literal translation would be: "Among Chu people, there existed somebody who was selling shields and spears." All words can be literally translated into English, except for the final particle zhě  'one who, somebody who', which works as nominalizer marking a verb phrase as certain kinds of noun phrases.

The original Chinese sentence is marked with five Japanese kaeriten as:

To interpret this, the word  'existed' marked with shita 下 'bottom' is shifted to the location marked by ue  'top'. Likewise, the word  'sell' marked with ni  'two' is shifted to the location marked by ichi  'one'. The re  'reverse' mark indicates that the order of the adjacent characters must be reversed. Or, to represent this kanbun reading in numerical terms:

Following these kanbun instructions step by step transforms the sentence so it has the typical Japanese subject–object–verb argument order. The Sino-Japanese on'yomi readings and meanings are:

Next, Japanese function words and conjugations can be added with okurigana, and Japanese to ... to  "and" can substitute Chinese  "and". More specifically, the first と is treated as an additional function word, and the second, the reading of 與:

Lastly, kun'yomi readings for characters can be annotated with furigana.  Normally furigana are only used for uncommon kanji or unusual readings.  This sentence's only uncommon kanji is hisa(gu)  'sell, deal in', a literary character which is included in neither the Kyōiku kanji nor the Jōyō kanji lists.  However, in kanbun texts it is relatively common to use a large amount of furigana—often there is an interest in "recovering" the readings used by people of the Heian or Nara periods, and since many kanji can be read either with on- or kun-yomi pronunciations in a kanbun text, the furigana can show at least one editor's opinion of how it may have been read.
 
The completed kundoku translation with kun'yomi reads as a well-formed Japanese sentence:

Coming full circle, this annotated Japanese kanbun example back-translates: "Among Chu people, there existed one who was selling shields and spears".

Unicode

Kanbun were added to the Unicode Standard in June 1993 with the release of version 1.1.

Alan Wood (linked below) says: "The Japanese word kanbun refers to classical Chinese writing as used in Japan. The characters in this range are used to indicate the order in which words should be read in these Chinese texts."

Two Unicode kaeriten are grammatical symbols for "linking marks" and "reverse marks". The others are organizational kanji for: numbers "1, 2, 3, 4"; locatives "top, middle, bottom"; Heavenly Stems "1st, 2nd, 3rd, 4th"; and levels "heaven, earth, person".

The Unicode block for kanbun is U+3190–U+319F:

See also
 Gugyeol
 Idu script
 Interlinear gloss
 Wakan Konko Bun

References

Citations

Bibliography

External links

Kanbun in Unicode
Kanbun – Test for Unicode support in Web browsers, Alan Wood
International Research Project Based on Kanbun Sources to Reconstruct a View of Japanese Culture, Nishōgakusha University

 
Archaic Japanese language
Japanese writing system
Reordered languages
Classical Chinese